The Moral Sinner is a 1924 American silent drama film directed by Ralph Ince and written by Willis Goldbeck, Josephine Quirk, and Rita Weiman, based on the 1904 play Leah Kleschna by C. M. S. McLellan. The film stars Dorothy Dalton, James Rennie, Alphonse Ethier, Frederick Lewis, Walter Percival, and Paul McAllister. The film was released on May 19, 1924, by Paramount Pictures.

The film is a remake of an early 1913 Adolph Zukor produced film, Leah Kleschna.

Plot
As described in a film magazine review, Anton Kleschna, a crook, has his daughter Leah for an accomplice and utilizes Raoul Berton, son of a French general, as a tool. Paul Sylvain rescues Leah from a burning building and she forms an attachment for him. She is sent to his study to steal the Sylvain diamonds, but is detected by Paul. Raoul appears half drunk, and Paul hides Leah. Meanwhile, Raoul gets the valuables. They are restored to Paul by Leah. She resolves to go straight and works in the fields with the peasants. There Paul finds her and persuades her to become his wife.

Cast

Preservation
With no copies of The Moral Sinner located in any film archives, it is lost film.

References

External links

Lobby card at www.gettyimages.com

1924 films
1920s English-language films
Silent American drama films
1924 drama films
Paramount Pictures films
Films directed by Ralph Ince
Lost American films
American black-and-white films
American silent feature films
1924 lost films
Lost drama films
1920s American films